The contemporary borders of the nations of Afghanistan and Turkmenistan are the products of The Great Game in Central Asia between the British and Russian Empires. As a result, the two countries have some cultural ties, with Afghanistan having 1.2 million Turkmen, the third largest Turkmen population behind Iran and Turkmenistan. 

Afghanistan depends on Turkmenistan for meeting a large part of the country's electricity needs. At present, Afghanistan imports more than 320 million kilowatt-hours of electricity every year from Turkmenistan.

Turkmenistan opened a major railway link to Afghanistan in 2016 to facilitate fuel exports.

Turkmenistan has not officially recognized the Taliban led government, the Islamic Emirate of Afghanistan, as Afghanistan's legitimate government. However, Turkmenistan has de facto diplomatic relations with the Taliban government and has facilitated the Taliban's appointment of diplomats to the Afghan Embassy in Ashgabat. The current chargé d'affaires is Fazal Muhammad Sabir, appointed in March 2022.

See also
Torghundi, a border crossing between Afghanistan and Turkmenistan
Turkmenistan–Afghanistan–Pakistan–India Pipeline (TAPI)

References

External links

 
Turkmenistan
Bilateral relations of Turkmenistan